Zhiyi (538–597 CE) also Chen De'an (陳德安), is the fourth patriarch of the Tiantai tradition of Buddhism in China. His standard title was Śramaṇa Zhiyi (沙門智顗), linking him to the broad tradition of Indian asceticism. Zhiyi is famous for being the first in the history of Chinese Buddhism to elaborate a complete, critical and systematic classification of the Buddhist teachings. He is also regarded as the first major figure to make a significant break from the Indian tradition, to form an indigenous Chinese system.

According to David W. Chappell, Zhiyi "has been ranked with Thomas Aquinas and al-Ghazali as one of the great systematizers of religious thought and practice in world history."

Biography
Born with the surname Chen in Huarong District, Jing Prefecture (now Hubei), Zhiyi left home to become a monk at eighteen, after the loss of his parents and his hometown Jiangling that fell to the Western Wei army when Zhiyi was seventeen. At 23, he received his most important influences from his first teacher, Nanyue Huisi (515–577 CE), a meditation master who would later be listed as Zhiyi's predecessor in the Tiantai lineage. After a period of study with Huisi (560–567), he spent some time working in the southern capital of Jiankang. Then in 575 he went to Tiantai mountain for intensive study and practice with a group of disciples. Here he worked on adapting the Indian meditation principles of śamatha and vipaśyanā (translated as "zhi" and "guan") into a complex system of self-cultivation practice that also incorporated devotional rituals and confession/repentance rites. Then in 585 he returned to Jinling, where he completed his monumental commentarial works on the Lotus Sutra, the Fahua wenzhu (587 CE), and the Fahua xuanyi (593 CE).

Chappell holds that Zhiyi: "...provided a religious framework which seemed suited to adapt to other cultures, to evolve new practices, and to universalize Buddhism."

Important works
Zhiyi's Xiao Zhiguan (lit "Small Treatise on Concentration and Insight") was probably the first practical manual of meditation in China. With its direct influence on the Tso-chan-i was very influential in the development of Chan meditation.

Rujun Wu identifies the Mohe Zhiguan (Traditional Chinese: 摩訶止觀; Simplified Chinese: 摩诃止观; pinyin: Móhē Zhǐguān; lit "Great treatise on Concentration and Insight") of Zhiyi as the seminal text of the Tiantai school. Of the works attributed to him (although many may have been written by his disciples), about thirty are extant.

Teaching

View on śamatha-vipaśyanā 

Zhiyi's Xiao Zhiguan offers an exposition of the practice of śamatha (calming or cessation) and vipaśyanā (wise seeing or contemplation). Zhiyi's Xiao Zhiguan states:There are many ways to enter the true reality of nirvana, but none that is more essential or that goes beyond the twofold method of cessation-and-contemplation. The reason is that "cessation" is the preliminary gate for overcoming the bonds [of passionate afflictions]; "contemplation" is the proper requisite for severing delusions. "Cessation" provides good nourishment for nurturing the mind; "contemplation" is the sublime technique for arousing spiritual understanding. "Cessation" is the preeminent cause for [attaining] dhyanic concentration; "contemplation" is the basis [for the accumulation of] of wisdom. If one perfects the twofold aspects of concentration (samadhi) and wisdom, then one is fully endowed with the aspects of both benefiting oneself and benefiting others.Zhiyi also notes that it’s necessary to have a balance between śamatha and vipaśyanā:It should be known that these two aspects are like the two wheels of a cart, or the two wings of a bird; if one side is cultivated disproportionately, then one falls prey to mistaken excess.

The Four Samadhis 

Zhiyi developed a curriculum of practice which was distilled into the 'Four Samadhis' (Chinese: 四種三昧; pinyin: sizhong sanmei). These Four Samadhi were expounded in Zhiyi's 'Mohe Zhiguan'. The Mohe Zhiguan is the magnum opus of Zhiyi's maturity and is held to be a "grand summary" of the Buddhist Tradition according to his experience and understanding at that time. The text of the Mohe Zhiguan was refined from lectures Zhiyi gave in 594 in the capital city of Jinling and was the sum of his experience at Mount Tiantai c.585 and inquiry thus far. Parsing the title, 'zhi' refers to "ch’an meditation and the concentrated and quiescent state attained thereby"  and 'guan' refers to "contemplation and the wisdom attained thereby". Swanson reports that Zhiyi held that there are two modes of zhi-guan: that of sitting in meditation 坐, and that of "responding to objects in accordance with conditions" 歷緣對境, which is further refined as abiding in the natural state of a calm and insightful mind under any and all activities and conditions.

Swanson states that Zhiyi in the Mohe Zhiguan:
...is critical of an unbalanced emphasis on "meditation alone", portraying it as a possible "extreme" view and practice, and offering instead the binome zhi-guan 止觀 (calming/cessation and insight/contemplation, śamatha-vipaśyanā) as a more comprehensive term for Buddhist practice.

The "Samadhi of One Practice" (Skt. Ekavyūha Samādhi; Ch. 一行三昧) which is also known as the "samadhi of oneness" or the "calmness in which one realizes that all dharmas are the same" (Wing-tsit Chan), is one of the Four Samadhi that both refine, mark the passage to, and qualify the state of perfect enlightenment expounded in the Mohe Zhiguan. The term "Samadhi of Oneness" was subsequently used by Daoxin.

The Four Samadhis are:
"Constantly Seated Samādhi" (chángzuò sānmèi 常坐三昧) - 90 days of motionless sitting, leaving the seat only for reasons of natural need.
"Constantly Walking Samādhi" (chángxíng sānmèi 常行三昧) - 90 days of mindful walking and meditating on Amitabha.
"Half-Walking Half-Seated Samādhi" (bànxíng bànzuò sānmèi 半行半坐三昧) - Includes various practices such as chanting, contemplation of the emptiness of all dharmas and the "Lotus samādhi" which includes penance, prayer, worship of the Buddhas, and reciting the Lotus sutra. 
"Neither Walking nor Sitting Samādhi" (fēixíng fēizuò sānmèi 非行非坐三昧) - This includes "the awareness of mental factors" as they arise in the mind. One is to contemplate them as "not moving, not originated, not extinguished, not coming, not going".

The Five Periods and Eight Teachings 
In order to provide a comprehensive framework for Buddhist doctrine, Zhiyi classified the various Buddhist sutras into the Five Periods and Eight Teachings.  These were also known as goji hakkyō in Japanese and osi palgyo (오시팔교) in Korean.  According to Zhiyi, the five periods of the Buddha's teachings were as follows:

 The Flower Garland period – taught immediately after the Buddha attained Enlightenment, lasting 3 weeks.  The teachings at this time were incomprehensible to all but advanced bodhisattvas, and thus Shakyamuni Buddha started over with more basic (the Agama) teachings.
 The Agama Period – taught at Deer Park, and lasting 12 years.  These consisted of the most elementary teachings of the Buddha including karma, rebirth, the Four Noble Truths, etc.
 The Correct and Equal Period – lasting 8 years.  This marks the Buddha's teachings that begin to transition from so-called "Hinayana" teachings to Mahayana ones.
 The Wisdom Period – lasting 22 years.  The teachings here consist of the Perfection of Wisdom teachings among others.  Here, the teachings were intended to demonstrate that the classifications of Hinayana and Mahayana were expedient only, and that were ultimately empty.
 The Lotus and Nirvana Period – lasting 8 years. The teachings of this final period mark the most "perfect" teachings, namely the Lotus Sutra and the Mahayana Nirvana Sutra, which encompass the Buddha's original intention.

These were compared in order to the five stages of milk: fresh milk, cream, curds, butter and ghee (clarified butter).

Further. the teachings of the Buddha were organized into four types based on the capacity of listener:
 Sudden teachings
 Gradual teachings
 Indeterminate teachings
 Secret or "esoteric" teachings.

and four types of sources:
 Hinayana
 Mahayana
 Teachings found in both
 Teachings that transcend both (e.g. Lotus Sutra)

Together these were the Eight Teachings of the Buddha attributed to Zhiyi.

Three Thousand Realms in a Single Moment 
Zhiyi taught the principle of Three Thousand Realms in a Single Thought Moment (Pinyin: Yīniàn Sānqiān) in his 'Great Concentration and Insight', based on the Lotus Sutra. The number 'Three Thousand' is derived from the Ten Worlds, multiplied by ten [because of the Mutual Possession of the Ten Worlds], which gives 100, multiplied by ten [the Ten Factors listed in Ch. 2 of the Lotus Sutra which gives 1,000. 1,000 multiplied by 3 [the Three Realms of Existence: Self, Other, and Environment] which gives 3,000.

Volume 5 of Great Concentration and Insight states:

See also
Guoqing Temple
Zhou Jichang

Notes

Works
 Dharmamitra (trans.): The Essentials of Buddhist Meditation by Shramana Zhiyi, Kalavinka Press 2008, 
 Donner, Neal & Daniel B. Stevenson (1993). The Great Calming and Contemplation. Honolulu: University of Hawai‘i Press.
 Shen, Haiyan. The Profound Meaning of the Lotus Sutra: T’ien-t’ai Philosophy of Buddhism volumes I and II. Delhi: Originals, 2005. 
 Swanson, Paul L.; trans. (2004). The Great Cessation and Contemplation (Mo-ho Chih-kuan, Chapter 1-6), CD-ROM, Tokyo: Kosei Publishing Co.
 Tam, Wai Lun (1986). A Study and Translation on the Kuan-hsin-lun of Chih-i (538-597) and its Commentary by Kuan-Ting, Hamilton, Ontario: McMaster University
 Thich Tien Tam, trans.  (1992). Ten Doubt about Pure Land by Dharma Master Chi-I (T. 47 No. 1961).  In: Pure Land Buddhism - Dialogues with Ancient Masters, NY: Sutra Translation Committee of the United States and Canada & Buddha Dharma Education Association, pp. 19–51.

Secondary sources
 Chappell, David W. (1987). 'Is Tendai Buddhism Relevant to the Modern World?', Japanese Journal of Religious Studies 14/2-3, 247–266. 
 Dumoulin, Heinrich (1993). "Early Chinese Zen Reexamined ~ A Supplement to 'Zen Buddhism: A History'", Japanese Journal of Religious Studies 1993 20/1.  
 Dumoulin, Heinrich (author); Heisig, James W. (trans.) & Knitter, Paul, trans. (2005). Zen Buddhism: A History. Volume 1: India and China. World Wisdom. 
 Hurvitz, Leon (1962). Chih-i (538–597): An Introduction to the Life and Ideas of a Chinese Buddhist Monk. Mélanges Chinois et Bouddhiques XII, Bruxelles: Institut Belge des Hautes Études Chinoises.
Kantor, Hans-Rudolf (2002). Contemplation: Practice, Doctrine and Wisdom in the Teaching of Zhiyi (538-597), Inter-Religio 42, 21-37
 Rhodes, Robert (2012). The Development of Zhiyi´s Three Contemplations and its Relation to the Three Truths Theory. In Conference Papers: Tiantai Buddhist Thought and Practice, Taipei: Huafan University, pp. 312–357
Stevenson, Daniel B. (1986). The Four Kinds of Samādhi in Early T'ien-t'ai Buddhism. In: Peter N. Gregory: Traditions of Meditation in Chinese Buddhism Vol. 1, Honolulu: University of Hawaii Press, pp.  45–98. .

External links

538 births
597 deaths
Chinese scholars of Buddhism
Northern Wei Buddhists
Northern Qi Buddhist monks
Sui dynasty Buddhist monks
Tiantai Buddhists
People from Ezhou
6th-century Chinese people
Chen dynasty Buddhist monks
Liang dynasty Buddhists